Penicillium boreae is a fungus species of the genus Penicillium.

See also
List of Penicillium species

References

Further reading

boreae
Fungi described in 2002